Tonći Kukoč-Petraello (born 25 September 1990) is a Croatian football defender who plays for Opatija.

He is the nephew of the former NBA player Toni Kukoč.

Club career
Born in Split, Kukoč started his career playing in youth level for his hometown club Hajduk Split. At the age of 18 he passed the trial with the Russian club Saturn, but Hajduk refused to release him as they had a scholarship contract with him until June 2009.

After signing a four-year contract with Hajduk, Kukoč was loaned to Istra 1961 for the first part of 2009–10 season. The rest of the season he spent on loan in the second division side Mosor. He made his professional debut for Hajduk the following season, when he replaced Ante Vukušić in the final minutes of the home match against NK Zagreb. In the midseason Kukoč was again loaned, this time to the last placed Hrvatski Dragovoljac in Prva HNL. He played five games for Dragovoljac, and scored his first goal in Prva HNL, after coming on as a substitute in a 3–2 defeat against Inter Zaprešić.

Hajduk decided to keep him for the 2011–12 Prva HNL season and has worked as a rotational player, playing in a few different positions. He scored his first goal for the club in a 4–0 win against NK Zagreb on 21 August 2011.

After spending one season at Italian side Brescia Calcio in Serie B, Kukoč joined CSKA Sofia in Bulgaria on 7 August 2014. He made his league debut for CSKA on 16 August, in a 2–0 away loss against Ludogorets Razgrad, playing the full 90 minutes as a left-back. Kukoč netted his first goal on 22 August, in the 5–0 home rout against Marek Dupnitsa. On 1 November 2014, he went close to opening the scoring in the 0–0 home draw against Slavia Sofia, hitting the crossbar with a powerful long-distance effort, but subsequently received a two-match ban following a post-match altercation with Georgi Petkov.

Career statistics

Club

References

External links

1990 births
Living people
Footballers from Split, Croatia
Association football fullbacks
Croatian footballers
Croatia under-21 international footballers
HNK Hajduk Split players
NK Istra 1961 players
NK Mosor players
NK Hrvatski Dragovoljac players
Brescia Calcio players
PFC CSKA Sofia players
U.S. Livorno 1915 players
Como 1907 players
HŠK Zrinjski Mostar players
Budapest Honvéd FC players
Kisvárda FC players
NK Opatija players
Croatian Football League players
Serie B players
First Professional Football League (Bulgaria) players
Premier League of Bosnia and Herzegovina players
Nemzeti Bajnokság I players
First Football League (Croatia) players
Croatian expatriate footballers
Expatriate footballers in Italy
Expatriate footballers in Bulgaria
Expatriate footballers in Bosnia and Herzegovina
Expatriate footballers in Hungary
Croatian expatriate sportspeople in Italy
Croatian expatriate sportspeople in Bulgaria
Croatian expatriate sportspeople in Bosnia and Herzegovina
Croatian expatriate sportspeople in Hungary